Bartolommeo Salvestrini (died Florence 1630) was an Italian painter of the Baroque period, active mostly in Florence. He was a pupil of Matteo Rosselli and  Giovanni Bilivert in Florence. He painted a Martyrdom of St Ursula for church of Santa Orsula in Florence, as well a paintings for the church of Santa Teresa. He died of the plague in 1630. A drawing at Art Institute of Chicago is attributed to the painter

Sources

17th-century Italian painters
Italian male painters
Painters from Florence
1630 deaths
Year of birth unknown